Cuatro contra el mundo (Spanish: Four Against the World) is a 1950 Mexican film noir crime drama film directed by Alejandro Galindo, who also wrote the screenplay alongside Gunther Gerzso, and starring Víctor Parra and Leticia Palma, about a gang that raids a van that carries money. The film is considered as a prototype for Mexican film noir.

Cast
Víctor Parra as Paco Mendiola
Leticia Palma as Lucrecia
Tito Junco as Máximo
José Pulido as Antonio Gil "Tony"
Manuel Dondé as El Lagarto
Conchita Gentil Arcos as Doña Trini
Salvador Quiroz as El general
Sara Montes as Novia de Tony
José Elías Moreno as Comandante Canseco
Bruno Márquez as Don Romulo (as Bruno T. Marquez)
Manuel de la Vega as Domínguez, agente policía
Ángel Infante as Manejador de cerveceria
Carlos Bravo y Fernández as Periodista (uncredited)
Ramón Bugarini as Detective (uncredited)
Rafael Estrada as Periodista (uncredited)
Jesús García as Empleado de sastre (uncredited)
Emilio Garibay as Policía (uncredited)
Leonor Gómez as Vecina de Lucrecia (uncredited)
Rafael Icardo as Señor Mantecol (uncredited)
Jorge Martínez de Hoyos as Don Nacho (uncredited)
Manuel Trejo Morales as Maestro Flaves, sastre (uncredited)
Alfredo Varela as Empleado de cerveceria (uncredited)
Hernán Vera as Velador de cerveceria (uncredited)

Themes
Film critic Emilio García Riera states that the film has a strong influence on the left-wing politics of director Alejandro Galindo. He stated that the film allowed him to represent a crime in a relatively small scenario as an expression of reactionary tendencies.

Production
Cuatro contra el mundo is considered a prototype for a Mexican version of film noir, a genre popularized in the United States in the 1940s.

Restoration
Cuatro contra el mundo has been restored in cooperation with the film library of the National Autonomous University of Mexico, Fundación Televisa, the Cineteca Nacional and the Morelia International Film Festival. The restored version was part of the Forum section of the 65th Berlin International Film Festival in 2015, after the head of this section, Christoph Terhechte, had seen it at the Morelia International Film Festival.

References

Bibliography
Ayala Blanco, Jorge. Cartelera cinematográfica 1950–1959.
García Riera, Emilio. Historia Documental del Cine Mexicano.

External links

1950 films
Film noir
1950s Spanish-language films
Films directed by Alejandro Galindo
Mexican crime drama films
1950 crime drama films
Mexican black-and-white films
1950s Mexican films